William Beckner may refer to:

 William M. Beckner (1841–1910), US representative
 William Beckner (mathematician) (born 1941), American mathematician